Malaria! was an experimental electronic band from West Berlin formed in 1981 by Gudrun Gut and Bettina Köster following the dissolution of Mania D with Karin Luner, Eva Gossling later Die Krupps and Beate Bartel (of Liaisons Dangereuses). Other members included Manon P. Duursma, Christine Hahn, and Susanne Kuhnke (also a member of Die Haut). They are most often associated with Neue Deutsche Welle and post-punk.

Malaria!'s most popular record was New York Passage (produced by Eric Dufaure for Cachalot Records), which was top 10 in both U.S. and European independent charts and led to a tour with The Birthday Party, John Cale, and Nina Hagen.

There are videos for the songs "Geld/Money", "Your Turn to Run", and "You, You" (directed by Anne Carlisle) along with a live video for "Thrash Me" featured in a German documentary called Super 80.

In 2001, an EP of Malaria! covers entitled Versus was released and included a popular cover of "Kaltes Klares Wasser" by Chicks on Speed.

Discography
 1981: Malaria (12")
 1981: How Do You Like My New Dog? (7")
 1982: Emotion (LP)
 1982: New York Passage (12")
 1982: White Water (12")
 1983: Revisited - Live (Kassette)
 1984: Beat the Distance (12")
 1991: Compiled (CD)
 1991: Kaltes Klares Wasser (CDM)
 1992: Elation (CDM)
 1993: Cheerio (CD)
 2001: Compiled 1981–1984 (CD)

References

External links
"Malaria!" from The great indie discography
"Germany" from Billboard
"Malaria!" from Forty years videoart.de, Part 1
 
 

Musical groups established in 1981
All-female bands
German musical groups
Neue Deutsche Welle groups